The 2015 London Sevens was the ninth and final tournament within the 2014–15 Sevens World Series. This edition of the London Sevens was held over the weekend of 16–17 May 2015 at Twickenham in London.

The most notable headline from this event was the first-ever overall tournament victory by the United States. The USA's Madison Hughes was named player of the tournament, with Hughes and Danny Barrett the two Americans selected for the tournament Dream Team.

The overall series crown was secured by Fiji when they defeated South Africa in the Cup quarter-finals.

Format
The teams were drawn into four pools of four teams each. Each team plays all the others in their pool once. The top two teams from each pool advance to the Cup/Plate brackets. The bottom two teams go into the Bowl/Shield brackets.

Teams
The pools and schedule were announced on 10 April 2015.

Pool Stage

Pool A

Pool B

Pool C

Pool D

Knockout stage

Shield

Bowl

Plate

Cup

Scoring

Source: WR website

References

External links
Official website

London Sevens
Dubai Sevens
London Sevens
London Sevens
Sevens